Singoalla is a 1949 Swedish–French film directed by Christian-Jaque, starring Viveca Lindfors and Alf Kjellin. It is based on the romantic novel The Wind Is My Lover by Viktor Rydberg, which in turn is based on a medieval legend of the love between a gypsy and a nobleman. It was produced in three language versions: Swedish, French, and English. The Swedish and French versions were entitled Singoalla. The English version had three titles: Gypsy Fury (USA), The Wind is My Lover (UK), and The Mask and the Sword (UK). The Swedish and English versions starred Alf Kjellin as the nobleman, but the French version starred Michel Auclair. All three versions were edited separately – even scoring is slightly different. The Swedish and French run over 100 minutes, the English only 63 minutes.

Cast 
 Viveca Lindfors as Singoalla
 Alf Kjellin (aka Christopher Kent) as Knight Erland Månesköld - Swedish and English versions
 Michel Auclair as Knight Erland Månesköld - French version
 Edvin Adolphson as Latzo
 Lauritz Falk as Assim
 Naima Wifstrand as Cioara
 John Elfström as Erasmus
 Märta Dorff as Elfrida Månesköld
 Vibeke Falk as Helena Ulfsax
 Georg Funkquist as Chaplain
 Jean Georges Chambot (aka Johnny Chambot) as Sorgbarn
 Katarina Taikon as Gypsy Woman (uncredited)

Depiction of the Romani People 
Singoalla stereotypically depicts the Romani People as being uncivilised thieves. The film hired many real Romani actors, among them was Katarina Taikon, who later became a civil rights leader and writer. After the film was released, the Romani actors expressed regret about having participated in a racist movie.

References

External links 
 
Publicity booklet for Singoalla / The Wind is My Lover - the final page has information how to view the different film versions

1949 films
1949 romantic drama films
1949 adventure films
1940s multilingual films
French romantic drama films
Swedish romantic drama films
1940s French-language films
1940s Swedish-language films
Films directed by Christian-Jaque
French black-and-white films
Swedish black-and-white films
Films based on Swedish novels
Films about Romani people
Films set in the 14th century
Films set in Sweden
French multilingual films
Swedish multilingual films
Fictional representations of Romani people
1940s French films